College bass fishing is competitive bass fishing that is played by teams from universities and colleges. The NCAA is not involved in college bass fishing, allowing teams to use sponsorships to their advantage and keep their winnings. College bass fishing consists of mostly club teams, but there are a select few varsity bass fishing programs. There are an estimated 610 college bass fishing teams in the United States. The major college bass fishing tournament series are the FLW Outdoors College Series, Boat U.S. Bass Pro Shops College Bass Fishing Series, Carhartt Bassmaster College Bass Fishing Series, and the Fishlife Collegiate Tour.

History 
The first known college bass fishing tournament took place at Lake Monroe, Indiana on April 18, 1992 between Purdue University and Indiana University. Purdue won the tournament by three pounds. Some of the historically most successful college bass fishing teams are Auburn University, Murray State University, Bethel University, University of Florida, Virginia Tech, University of Georgia, North Carolina State University, Louisiana State University, and the University of Illinois. College bass fishing is a growing college sport and in recent years, some schools have even started varsity programs, such as Adrian College in Michigan and Campbellsville University in Kentucky. These schools are both the first varsity college bass fishing programs in their state.  The University of Delaware Bass Fishing Team was the first collegiate bass fishing team in the state of Delaware.

Official rules and scoring 
 Two fisherman allowed per boat
 Bass kept must be at least 12 inches in length (depending on the lake)
 Five bass limit allowed per team at weigh in (largemouth bass, smallmouth bass, spotted bass, are the only species accepted)
 .25 ounces deducted for each dead bass weighed in
 One pound deducted for each short bass weighed in
 One pound deducted for every minute late after weigh-in deadline time
 Greatest overall weight of bass limit wins the event

Different tournament series, divisions, regionals, and tournaments

FLW College Series 
 Central Division
 Northern Division
 Southeastern Division
 Southern Division
 Western Division
 Open 
 Championship

Carhartt Bassmaster College Series 
 Southern Regional
 Central Regional
 Eastern Regional
 Western Regional
 Midwestern Regional
 Wild Card

Cabela's Collegiate Bass Fishing Series 
 Collegiate Big Bass Bash
 Collegiate Bass Fishing Open
 Collegiate Bass Fishing Shootout
 Collegiate Bass Fishing Championship

Championships

FLW College Series Championships 

 2010: University of Florida
 2011: University of Florida
 2012: Kansas State University
 2013: University of Louisiana Monroe
 2014: University of Minnesota
 2015: University of South Carolina
 2016: University of South Carolina
 2017: Kansas State University
 2018: University of Louisiana Monroe
 2019: Murray State University
 2020: Stephen F. Austin State University

Cabela's Collegiate Bass Fishing Series 
 2006: North Carolina State University
 2007: University of Kansas
 2008: Texas A&M
 2009: Murray State University
 2010: Tarleton State University
 2011: University of Arkansas
 2012: North Carolina State University
 2013: Bethel University
 2014: Lamar University
 2015: Northern Kentucky University
 2016: Auburn University
 2017: University of North Alabama
 2018: Bethel University

The Fishlife Collegiate Tour 
 2013: Alabama
 2014: Alabama/Birmingham Southern

Lack of NCAA involvement 
The NCAA is not involved in college bass fishing, which allows teams to use sponsorships to their advantage. Sponsorships allow bass fishermen to represent and advertise a company, receiving gear, publicity, and sometimes money in return. Also, lack of NCAA involvement in college bass fishing allows college bass fishermen to win money. This subject is very controversial, as college bass fishing is one of only a couple of collegiate sports where college athletes can actually win money (cycling for example). However, if the NCAA got involved with college bass fishing, that would be the end of not only college fishermen being eligible to win money but also the end of sponsorships. Without sponsorships, college bass fishing would be a different sport, since most college anglers are financially responsible to provide their own boats, fishing gear, gas money, and travel.

References 

Smallwood, Scott. "Reel world." The Chronicle of Higher Education. 52.38 (2006): A8. General OneFile. Web. 17 Nov. 2014.
"BoatUS Collegiate Bass Fishing Tournament News." BoatUS News. N.p., n.d. Web. 17 Nov. 2014.
"Campbellsville University Athletics - Green River Lake." Campbellsville University Athletics - Green River Lake. N.p., n.d. Web. 17 Nov. 2014.
Card, James. "Gone Fishing on Scholarship, With Hopes of Turning Pro." The New York Times. 22 June 2010. Web. 17 Nov. 2014.
"Final Time Around for The Hoosier Duo." IU Bass Fishing RSS. N.p., n.d. Web. 17 Nov. 2014.
"Fishing League Worldwide." FLW College Fishing. N.p., n.d. Web. 17 Nov. 2014.
Schonbrun, Zach. "Collegiate Fishing's Added Lure: Cash on the Line." The New York Times. 17 Oct. 2014. Web. 17 Nov. 2014.
"Top 25 College Fishing Teams." Bassmaster. N.p., n.d. Web. 17 Nov. 2014.
"Tournament Results." Collegiate Bass Fishing Championship -. N.p., n.d. Web. 17 Nov. 2014.

Recreational fishing in the United States
fishing